D33, D.33 or D-33 may refer to:

Ships 
 Almirante Garcia, an Almirante Clemente-class destroyer of the Venezuelan Navy
 , a Fletcher-class destroyer of the Brazilian Navy
 , a County-class heavy cruiser of the Royal Australian Navy
 , a D-class destroyer of the Royal Navy

Other uses 
 Akaflieg Darmstadt D-33, a German experimental glider
 D33 road (Croatia)
 Dewoitine D.33, a French single-engined monoplane 
 LNER Class D33, a class of British steam locomotives
 Tarrasch Defense, a chess opening